The 2017 BYU Cougars football team represented Brigham Young University in the 2017 NCAA Division I FBS football season. The Cougars were led by second-year head coach Kalani Sitake and played their home games at LaVell Edwards Stadium. This was the seventh year BYU competed as an NCAA Division I FBS independent. BYU had 13 regular season games scheduled in the season, due to their finale game at Hawaii, which NCAA rules allow them to schedule one extra home game. They finished the season 4–9.

Before the season

2017 recruits

2017 returned missionaries

2017 other additions

2017 departures

During the season

2017 departures

Media

Football Media Day

Nu Skin BYU Sports Network Affiliates
Broadcasters: Greg Wrubell, Marc Lyons, & Nate Meikle

BYU Radio- Flagship Station Nationwide (Dish Network 980, Sirius XM 143, TuneIn radio, and byuradio.org)
KSL 102.7 FM and 1160 AM- (Salt Lake City/ Provo, Utah and ksl.com)
KIDO- Boise, Idaho (football only)
KTHK- Blackfoot/ Idaho Falls/ Pocatello/ Rexburg, Idaho
KSUB- Cedar City, Utah
KMGR- Manti, Utah
KDXU- St. George, Utah
KSHP- Las Vegas, Nevada (football only)
TuneIn- Nu Skin BYU Sports Network

Roster

Depth chart

Schedule

 The game between LSU and BYU was originally scheduled to take place at NRG Stadium in Houston.  However, due to massive flooding caused by Hurricane Harvey in the Houston area, school and game officials decided to relocate the game to New Orleans.

Game summaries

Portland State

Sources:

Uniform combination: white helmet, blue jersey, white pants.

LSU

Sources:

Key injury: TE Moroni Laulu-Pututau

Uniform combination: white helmet, royal blue jersey, white pants.

Utah

Sources:

Key injury: Starting QB Tanner Mangum was knocked out with an ankle injury.

Uniform combination: white helmet, royal blue jersey, white pants.

Wisconsin

Sources:

Key injury: RB Trey Dye was injured.

Uniform combination: white helmet, white jersey, white pants.

Utah State

Sources:

Key injury: Starting QB Beau Hoge was knocked out with a concussion.

Uniform combination: white helmet, royal blue jersey, white pants.

Boise State

Sources:

Uniform combination: white helmet, blue jersey, white pants.

Mississippi State

Sources:

Uniform combination: white helmet, white jersey, blue pants.

ECU

Sources:

Uniform combination: white helmet, white jersey, blue pants.

San Jose State

Sources:

Key injury: Starting RB K.J. Hall was knocked out with an injury after rushing for over 100 yards in the first half. Hall was the first RB this season to rush for over 100 yds. The former starting RB, Ula Tolutau, was suspended after being charged with marijuana possession.

Uniform combination: white helmet, blue jersey, white pants, pink accents (in honor of breast cancer awareness month).

Fresno State

Sources:

Key injury: Starting QB Tanner Mangum was knocked out with a right Achilles injury. It is a season ending injury.

Uniform combination: white helmet, white jersey, blue pants.

UNLV

Sources:

Uniform combination: white helmet, white jersey, blue pants.

UMass

Sources:

Uniform combination: white helmet, blue jersey, white pants w/ blue accents

Hawaii

Sources:

References

BYU
BYU Cougars football seasons
BYU Cougars football